Psylocke is the name of two connected fictional mutant superheroes appearing in comic books published by Marvel Comics, commonly in association with the X-Men.

The first character to use the Psylocke moniker, Betsy Braddock, was initially a supporting character in stories focusing on her twin brother Brian, adopting the codename upon joining the X-Men. For 29 years of publication history, the character was body-swapped in-story with the assassin Kwannon. 

Kwannon took on the moniker to become the second Psylocke after both women returned to their respective bodies and Braddock claimed the mantle of Captain Britain.

Publication history

Betsy Braddock

Created by writer Chris Claremont, Elizabeth "Betsy" Braddock first appeared in Captain Britain #8 (Dec. 1976), with Captain Britain #10 (Dec. 1976) as her first cover appearance, published by the Marvel Comics' British imprint Marvel UK. In New Mutants Annual #2 (1986), Claremont integrated Betsy Braddock into the X-Men franchise. After being rescued by the New Mutants and taking up residence at their mutant-training academy, Braddock is formally invited to join the X-Men and officially adopts the codename Psylocke, becoming an enduring fixture of the team over the next three decades. 

In a 1989 story,  an amnesiac Betsy is kidnapped by The Hand, who brainwash her and physically alter her to take on an East Asian appearance.  Under the name Lady Mandarin she briefly becomes the Hand’s supreme assassin. While her memories return, she retains her new appearance and skills, including the ability to manifest the focused totality of her telepathic power in the form of a “psychic knife.” A 1993 story by Fabian Nicieza  would retroactively establish that Braddock’s changed appearance was the product of a body swap between Braddock and the assassin Kwannon. 

In the Claremont-written X-Treme X-Men #2 (2001), the character dies, her comic book death lasting until 2005's Uncanny X-Men #455. During the Hunt for Wolverine storyline, the psychic vampire Sapphire Styx absorbs the entirety of Braddock’s soul, leaving her body dead. After destroying Sapphire Styx from the inside with assistance from a fragment of Wolverine’s soul, Braddock reconstitutes her original body with the villain’s remaining soul power.

During the Dawn of X, Braddock subsequently took up her brother Brian’s former title of Captain Britain, forming a new iteration of Excalibur with Apocalypse, Gambit, Rogue, Jubilee, and Rictor, to protect the Kingdom of Avalon.

Kwannon

In Kwannon’s first appearance, using the codename Revanche, she traveled to the United States to confront Braddock, believing herself to be the real Betsy Braddock due to amnesia caused by the body swap. She discovered that she was formerly The Hand’s prime assassin before incurring brain damage and falling comatose as a result a battle with her lover Matsu’o Tsurayaba, a high-ranking member of the Hand. In hopes that, due to Kwannon’s low-level psychic abilities, the powers of the high-level telepath Betsy Braddock would be able to save her life, Tsurayaba sought the help of the sorceress Spiral, who instead transferred the women’s minds into each other’s bodies rather than simply recovering Kwannon.

After accepting that she is not the original Betsy Braddock, Kwannon becomes a member of the X-Men, shortly thereafter contracting the Legacy Virus.  As the disease progressed, Kwannon’s psychic abilities increased, allowing her to clarify her own distorted memory. Choosing to die on her own terms, Kwannon confronts Tsurayaba, who complies with her request to kill her rather than waiting to succumb to the disease.

Following the Hunt for Wolverine, when Braddock was restored to her original body, Kwannon was reborn in her original body as well.  Claiming the codename Psylocke for herself, Kwannon became a citizen of the mutant nation of Krakoa.  After the apparent murder of her long-lost daughter by a threatening artificial intelligence called Apoth, Psylocke assembled a new team of Fallen Angels with X-23 and Cable. After finding out that Apoth was using children to disseminate a technological drug called Overclock, Mister Sinister modified  Overclock to allow Psylocke to interact with Apoth in a cyberspace, killing Apoth, whose remains she delivered to Mister Sinister in exchange for his assistance in keeping this extrajudicial mission a secret from the Krakoan Quiet Council.

Following the Apoth incident, Psylocke was assigned to monitor Mister Sinister’s new team of Hellions, composed of mutants considered too violent or troubled to assimilate into Krakoan society. The character was later featured as a member of the Marauders as the team was refocused on their mission of mutant rescue.

In other media

Psylocke has been featured in media other than comic books, including the 1992 X-Men animated television series, a variety of video games, as well as film portrayals by Meiling Melançon in the 2006 film X-Men: The Last Stand and by Olivia Munn in the 2016 film X-Men: Apocalypse. Appearances prior to 2019 have generally featured the iteration of the character with Braddock's mind in Kwannon's body, while the Kwannon iteration has since been featured as a purchasable outfit in Fortnite Battle Royale.

References

Marvel Comics female superheroes
Fictional energy swordfighters